Richard McCarthy may refer to:

Richard D. McCarthy (1927–1995), American politician
Richard McCarthy (cricketer) (born 1961), Australian cricketer
Darby McCarthy (Richard Lawrence McCarthy), Indigenous Australian jockey
Richard McCarthy (activist), American sustainable agriculture activist

See also
Richie McCarthy (born 1988), Irish hurler
Rick McCarthy (disambiguation)